Luna is a commune in Cluj County, Transylvania, Romania.

Villages
The commune is composed of three villages: Gligorești (formerly Sămărtinu Sărat; Sószentmárton), Luna (Aranyoslóna) and Luncani (Aranyosgerend).

Luncani
Luncani, previously Grindeni ( or Gerend), is a village in the Luna commune and has a population of 1454 people (2002).

Demographics 
According to a census taken in 2002, the commune has a population of 4,450. Of this population, 86.17% are ethnic Romanians, 10.24% are ethnic Hungarians and 3.48% ethnic Romani.

Luna and Gligorești have a Romanian majority, while in Luncani, Hungarians represent the majority.

References

Atlasul localităților județului Cluj (Cluj County Localities Atlas), Suncart Publishing House, Cluj-Napoca

External links
  History of the village

Communes in Cluj County
Localities in Transylvania